Derek Thomas may refer to:
 Derek Thomas (politician), British politician
 Derek Thomas (theologian) (born 1953), professor of theology
 Derek Thomas (basketball) (born 1966), college basketball coach

See also

Derrick Thomas (agricultural scientist) (1944–2013), British agricultural scientist
Derrick Thomas (1967–2000), American football linebacker